Naresh Iyer (born 3 January 1981) is an Indian playback singer. Born Mumbai, Iyer is fluent in Malayalam,Tamil, Kannada, Hindi and Marathi.  Naresh Iyer has rendered  2000 film songs in several Indian languages and has several chart hits to his credit. His rendition of "Roobaroo" from the movie Rang De Basanti composed by A. R. Rahman topped the music charts for many weeks in 2006 and won him the National Film Award for Best Male Playback Singer. He won the Filmfare award in the R.D. Burman Musical Talent category.

Early life
Naresh Iyer was born to Shankar Iyer and Radha on 3 January 1981 and brought up in Matunga, Mumbai. He has a younger sister named Nisha Iyer, who is an upcoming self-taught Professional Artist. He attended SIES College of Commerce and Economics where he received his Degree in Commerce. After graduation he intended to become a Chartered Accountant and was practicing CA and side by side was learning Carnatic music and Hindustani classical music too.

Career

Naresh was spotted by composer A. R. Rahman in a reality talent show, Channel V's Super Singer. Though he did not win the show, Naresh was later contacted by A. R. Rahman and made his debut with the song "Mayilirage" from Anbe Aaruyire. He has also sung for other composers in Tamil, Telugu, Hindi and Malayalam.

Naresh is also the vocalist of a Mumbai based fusion band called Dhvani.

He also won the R.D. Burman Award as the best male upcoming singer.

The same year he also won the National Award for Best Playback Singer(Male) for his rendition of "Rubaroo" from the movie "Rang De Basanti".

Awards
 2006 – National Film Award for Best Male Playback Singer for the song "Roobaroo" from Rang De Basanti
 2007: Filmfare RD Burman Award for New Music Talent – Rang De Basanti
 2007 - Nominated for IIFA Award for Roobaroo along with Mr.A.R.Rahman
 2007 – Filmfare Award for Best Male Playback Singer – Tamil for the song "Mundhinam Parthenae" from Vaaranam Aayiram
 2006 – Filmfare RD Burman Award for New Music Talent 
 2005 – Hub Award for Best Playback Singer for the song "Mayilarage" from Anbe Aaruyire
 2006 – Kannadasan Award for Best Male Debut
 2008 – Hub Award for Best Playback Singer for the song "Mundhinam Parthenae" from Vaaranam Aayiram
 2010 – South Scope Award for Best Male Playback singer for the song "Oru Vetkam Varudhe" from Pasanga
 2011 – Uninor Mirchi Music Award for Best Male Playback Singer for the song "Nenu Nuvantu" from Orange

Discography

Soundtracks

Hindi songs 
 2006 - Rang De Basanti (Rubaru)
 2011 - Dil Toh Baccha Hai Ji (Tere Bin Reprise)

Tamil songs

Telugu songs

Malayalam songs 

Film- Usthad Hotel- Mel Mel Mel (Co - Singer : Anna Katharina Valayil)

Film - Anwar- Kanninima Neele (Co - Singer : Shreya Ghoshal)

Film - Finals - Nee Mazhavillu Polen (Co - Singer : Priya Prakash Varrier]

Film- Chewing Gum - En Jeevane (Co - Singer : Shwetha M)

References

External links
 https://www.facebook.com/nareshiyer.officialpage/
 

1981 births
Tamil playback singers
Indian male playback singers
Bollywood playback singers
Kannada playback singers
Living people
Singers from Mumbai
Filmfare Awards South winners
Best Male Playback Singer National Film Award winners